Seoule Simeon (also spelled Seule Simeon; born 10 October 1970) is a Vanuatuan politician.

A member of Vanuatu's francophone minority, Simeon went to Lycée Louis-Antoine de Bougainville, but did not seek higher education.

In the 2016 general election, Simeon was elected Member of Parliament for  Épi Island district as a member of the Union of Moderate Parties (the historically conservative party of francophones). On November 26 during a cabinet reshuffle, Prime Minister Charlot Salwai named Simeon Minister of Youth and Sports. He remained in this role until September 6, 2019, when he was elected Speaker of the Parliament.

Simeon was re-elected in the 2020 general election, this time as a member of the Reunification Movement for Change. He was named Minister of Education in the cabinet of Prime Minister Bob Loughman. In November 2020, Simeon resigned his position in the RMC to sit among the opposition benches.

References

1970 births
Living people
Presidents of Vanuatu
Education ministers
Vanuatuan politicians
Speakers of the Parliament of Vanuatu
Reunification Movement for Change politicians
Union of Moderate Parties politicians
Place of birth missing (living people)